Dolomedes sulfureus is a species of spiders commonly known as fishing spiders belonging to the genus Dolomedes. They produce a venom that contains a group of neurotoxic peptides.  The species is found in Russia, China, Korea, and Japan.

References

External links
Taxonomy at UniProt
Encyclopedia of Life
Taxonomy at ZipcodeZoo
Animal Diversity Web
BOLDSYSTEMS
Taxonomy at ITIS Report
Comparative Toxicogenomics Database
Taxon profile at BioLib

sulfureus
Spiders of Asia
Spiders of Russia
Spiders described in 1878